Kellie Suttle (born May 9, 1973, in Saint Peters, Missouri) is a retired female track and field athlete from the United States, who competed in the pole vault event.

A two-time Olympian (2000 and 2004), she won the silver medal at the 1999 Pan American Games in Winnipeg, Manitoba, Canada and the silver at the 2001 World Indoor Championships. Won 1998 outdoor US championships and 2006 indoor US championships. After competing at Arkansas State University, she became part of the training stable of former world record holder Earl Bell in Jonesboro, Arkansas and trained with a number of the world's top men and women pole vaulters.

Competition record

External links
 Kellie Suttle at USA Track & Field
 
 
 

1973 births
Living people
People from St. Peters, Missouri
Sportspeople from Greater St. Louis
Track and field athletes from Missouri
American female pole vaulters
Olympic track and field athletes of the United States
Athletes (track and field) at the 2000 Summer Olympics
Athletes (track and field) at the 2004 Summer Olympics
Pan American Games medalists in athletics (track and field)
Athletes (track and field) at the 1999 Pan American Games
Athletes (track and field) at the 2003 Pan American Games
World Athletics Championships athletes for the United States
Arkansas State Red Wolves women's track and field athletes
Pan American Games silver medalists for the United States
Competitors at the 1998 Goodwill Games
Competitors at the 2001 Goodwill Games
Medalists at the 1999 Pan American Games